San Giuseppe is a Baroque-style Roman Catholic Сhurch and monastery in the town of Castelnuovo di Garfagnana, region of Tuscany, Italy.

History
The convent was built in 1632 commissioned by Giambattista d'Este, formerly Alfonso III d'Este, Duke of Modena, who had abandoned his title to enter the Capuchin order. He died in the convent in 1644 and his funeral monument is found inside the church.

References

Churches in the province of Lucca
Roman Catholic churches in Tuscany
Roman Catholic churches completed in 1632
17th-century Roman Catholic church buildings in Italy
1632 establishments in Italy